Turbo is the tenth studio album by English heavy metal band Judas Priest, released on 21 March 1986 by Columbia Records. The album is notable for the band's change to a commercial glam metal sound, that had them using synthesizers for the first time.

A remastered CD was released in 2001, including two bonus tracks. On 3 February 2017, the album was reissued as Turbo 30 for its 30th anniversary, including two CDs of a live performance at the Sandstone Amphitheater near Kansas City, Missouri, on 22 May 1986.

Overview
Following the success of their previous album, Defenders of the Faith, Judas Priest initially recorded a double album which was intended to be released under the title Twin Turbos, half of which would be more commercial and the other half would be aggressive heavy metal. This idea was scrapped. Instead, the material was split up, with the more commercial songs appearing as the album Turbo. The lyrical content on Turbo was markedly different from previous Judas Priest albums, with more emphasis on grounded subjects such as love and romance rather than the band's usual sci-fi and fantasy themes. On the whole, it was a response to the changed music scene of the mid-1980s which was becoming focused more on light, synth-driven pop rather than the driving hard rock of the 1970s to early 1980s.

After concluding the Metal Conqueror World Tour at the end of 1984, the band took their first-ever extended hiatus and did not perform at all during 1985 except for an appearance at the Live Aid Concert where only three songs were played. Work began on Turbo that summer and finished late in the year. During this time, singer Rob Halford struggled with increasing substance abuse and violent feuds with his romantic partner. After the latter committed suicide, he resolved to get clean and so checked into rehab where he spent a month during December 1985 – January 1986. He made an energetic recovery and his live performances during the subsequent tour were described as some of his strongest ever.

With the album being released in April 1986, Turbo was an instant commercial success. The album was certified Gold by the RIAA on 10 June 1986 and Platinum on 24 July 1987. The album reached No. 33 on the UK Albums Chart and No. 17 on the Billboard 200, marking the apex of Priest's commercial success and being the band's highest chart position until 2005's Angel of Retribution. The music videos supporting "Turbo Lover" and "Locked In" enjoyed heavy rotation on MTV, furthering the success of the album commercially.

The cover was once again done by graphic artist Doug Johnson, who designed the Screaming for Vengeance and Defenders of the Faith covers.

"Reckless" was asked to be on the soundtrack of the movie Top Gun, but Judas Priest declined, both because they thought the film would flop and because it would have meant leaving the song off Turbo. However, their next album, Ram It Down, contained a cover of "Johnny B. Goode" that was featured in the soundtrack for the movie of the same title. "Reckless" and "Wild Nights, Hot & Crazy Days" were also Judas Priest's first songs to be played lower than E tuning.

"Parental Guidance" was allegedly written as a response to Tipper Gore's attack on the band, and heavy metal in general, in the mid-1980s. Her organization, the Parents Music Resource Center (PMRC), had placed the band's song "Eat Me Alive" (from Defenders of the Faith) at No. 3 on their list of offensive songs, referred to as the "Filthy 15". The PMRC alleged that the song was obscene because it encouraged the performance of oral sex at gunpoint.

Reception
Turbo sold well initially, and was certified Gold by the RIAA on 10 June 1986 and Platinum on 24 July 1987. It reached No. 33 in the UK and No. 17 on Billboard 200, the band's highest chart position until 2005's Angel of Retribution. The album would be Priest's final platinum-selling album. Sales tapered off and the subsequent live album from the otherwise successful Fuel for Life tour did not sell as well, only going Gold after a string of Platinum certified albums.

Seven of the album's nine songs were performed during the Fuel for Life tour with "Hot for Love" being the least played of those. The title track has remained in the band's set lists since then and "Out in the Cold" reappeared in 2019. During the tour, the band also dispensed with the black leather and studs look they'd sported since 1978 and went for a slightly more colourful "glam" leather wardrobe. A number of older songs such as "Sinner" and "Exciter" were also dropped from the live setlist, leading K. K. Downing to remark "People ask why we don't play Sinner anymore. I tell them it's because we've all repented."

Rob Halford referred to Turbo as the "love/hate Judas Priest album". In 2008 he told Kerrang!: 

Despite Turbos achievement and reception, Downing said that "it wasn't the big-selling album that we hoped for. I think quite a lot of that went on with the acceptability and success of a lot of other bands that you would look at on MTV. Even Ozzy went to the hairdressers." In his 2020 memoir  Confess, Halford admitted that he now sees his lyrics on Turbo as subpar, stating that his alcohol and substance abuse at the time had started to take their toll on his writing process.

Track listing30th Anniversary Edition – bonus live CDs'''

Personnel
Judas Priest
Rob Halford – vocals
K. K. Downing – guitars, guitar synthesizer
Glenn Tipton – guitars, guitar synthesizer
Ian Hill – bass
Dave Holland – drums

Additional Musician
Jeff Martin – backing vocals on "Wild Nights, Hot & Crazy Days"

Lead Guitar CreditsTurbo Lover – Glenn TiptonLocked In – KK Downing, Tipton, Downing, Tipton, underlying melody – Downing, arpeggios and run – TiptonPrivate Property – TiptonParental Guidance – first half – Tipton, second half – DowningRock You All Around The World – TiptonOut in the Cold – intro – Tipton, solo first half – Downing, solo second half – TiptonWild Nights, Hot and Crazy Days – DowningHot For Love – Downing, harmony section – bothReckless'' – intro – both, solo – Tipton, licks – Downing

Production (Original)
Produced by Tom Allom
Recorded at Compass Point Studios, Nassau, IN
Engineered by Bill Dooley, assisted by Paul Wertheimer and Sean Burrows
Mixed by Glenn Tipton, K. K. Downing, Tom Allom, and Bill Dooley at The Record Plant
Equipment surveillance by Tom Calcaterra
Mastered by Bernie Grundman
Cover design by Doug Johnson

Production (30th Anniversary Remaster)
Remastered by Mandy Parnell at Black Saloon Studios
Revised artwork by Mark Wilkinson
Photography by Ross Halfin, Mark Weiss, and Neil Zlozower

Production (30th Anniversary Remaster Bonus Live CDs)
Recorded at Sandstone Amphitheatre, Bonner Springs, KS on 22 May 1986
Mixed by Tom Allom and Jack Rushton
Mastered by Mandy Parnell at Black Saloon Studios

Charts

Certifications

References

External links
 Extensive album info

1986 albums
Albums produced by Tom Allom
Albums recorded at Record Plant (Los Angeles)
Columbia Records albums
Judas Priest albums